Laranjal do Jari (Jari Orangery) is a municipality located in the west of the state of Amapá in Brazil. It is the only municipality in the west boundaries of Amapá, except for a small part of Vitória do Jari. Its population is 51,362 and its area is 30,783 km², which makes it the largest municipality of Amapá.

History 
The land was originally inhabited by Amerindians. Later businessmen set up rubber plantations. The largest plantation was owned by  who owned  of land which made him the biggest landowner at the time. In 1948, his tenants revolted and he was forced to sell the land to Portuguese businessmen who sold it to Daniel K. Ludwig, an American billionaire, in 1964.

In 1967, Ludwig conceived the Jari project. He wanted to replace the rainforest with Gmelina arborea for the pulp industry. A planned city called Monte Dourado was built in Almeirim, however it was unable to provide housing for all the workers, and a shanty town called Beiradão emerged on the other side of the Jari River. The project turned into a major money losing failure, and in 1982, he sold the land. 

In 1987, the land became an independent municipality, and Beiradão was renamed Laranjal do Jari. The city is still mainly a river slum, and suffers from fires, floods, and open sewage.

Transport 
Laranjal do Jari is connected to the BR-156 and BR-210 highways. The city of Monte Dourado can be reached by ferry.

Nature 
The municipality contains 39% of the  Rio Cajari Extractive Reserve, created in 1990.
It also contains 69% of the  Rio Iratapuru Sustainable Development Reserve, created in 1997.
A part of the Tumucumaque Mountains National Park is located within the municipality.

Indigenous peoples 
The Wayampi Indigenous Territory is located in the municipality and is home to the Wayampi and Aparai people. The area inside Laranjal do Jari measures . A group of Wayampi have settled along the Amapari and Anakui Rivers, however information about the group is very limited.

Villages 
 São Francisco do Iratapuru

References

External links 
 Official website (in Portuguese)
 

Municipalities in Amapá
Populated places in Amapá
Populated places established in 1987
1987 establishments in Brazil